Estadio Municipal de El Plantío is a stadium in Burgos, Spain.  It is currently used for football (soccer) matches and is the home stadium of Burgos CF.  The stadium holds 12,194 spectators. The construction of the stadium started on June 22, 1963, a few months after the project presentation. 

In March 2018 the reform of three of its four stands began.

Gallery

References

External links
Stadium information
Estadios de España 

El Plantio
Burgos CF
Buildings and structures in Burgos
Sports venues completed in 1964
Sport in Burgos